Clara  is a townland and Catholic parish in the Diocese of Ossory (Roman Catholic): also one of the Civil parishes in Ireland. Both parishes are located in County Kilkenny in the Republic of Ireland.

Clara Catholic Parish

The Catholic Parish of Clara in the Diocese of Ossory was created  from the old Catholic parish of Gowran.

Clara church parish consists of the civil parishes of: Clara, Blackrath (upper), Blackrath (lower), St. Martin's and Tiscoffin.

Clara Civil Parish

The civil parish consists of approximately 1000 inhabitants, and is situated three miles east of Kilkenny city.

Clara civil parish consists of the following townlands: Ballynamona - Baunmore - Churchclara - Clara Upper - Clarabricken - Clifden or Rathgarvan - Clohoge - Coneygar - Eagleshill - Kilmagar - Kingsland - Scart.

Notable places and people
Saint Colman's church is situated at the centre of the parishes and Saint Colman is considered the patron saint of Clara. St.Colman's church is actually located just within Rathgarvan townland and not the neighbouring townland of Churchclara, wherein  lie the remains of the old church of Clara. St. Colman is a common saint's name in Ireland. The Martyrology of Donegal lists ninety six saints of this name and the Book of Leinster records two hundred and nine. In addition there seems to be some confusion in ancient texts between Colman (Colmanus in Latin) and Columbanus.

Clara is also home to Clara Castle, a five-storey tower house built in the fifteenth century by the Shortall family.

Sport
The civil parish is home to the Clara GAA club, which has produced several inter-county hurlers such as Jim Langton, Paddy Prendergast, Lester Ryan and Harry Ryan. One of the team's milestones in sport came in 1986, when they won their first Senior Hurling Championship. They also later won the 2013 Senior Hurling Championship.

See also 
 List of towns and villages in Ireland

References

External links 
 Information about Clara on the Ossory website
 Clara GAA club
 County Kilkenny Ireland Genealogy - "Summary Histories for selected County Kilkenny Surnames"

Townlands of County Kilkenny